Alvin Independent School District is a school district based in Alvin, Texas, U.S.

Alvin ISD is a large suburban school district south of Houston in Alvin, Manvel, Hillcrest, Iowa Colony, Liverpool, and portions of Pearland. It also serves Amsterdam and some areas with Rosharon postal addresses. AISD serves Pearland city's rapidly growing western portion of the city including the new large master-planned communities of Shadow Creek Ranch, South Fork, and Southern Trails.

Finances
As of the 2020/21 school year, the appraised valuation of property in the district was $10,805,729,375. The Maintenance tax rate was $1.0052. The I&S Rate is .3925. The tax rate was $1.3977 per $100 of appraised valuation.

Academic achievement
In 2011, the school district was rated "Recognized" by the Texas Education Agency.  Forty-nine percent of districts in Texas in 2011 received the same rating. No state accountability ratings will be given to districts in 2012. A school district in Texas can receive one of four possible rankings from the Texas Education Agency: Exemplary (the highest possible ranking), Recognized, Academically Acceptable, and Academically Unacceptable (the lowest possible ranking).

Historical district TEA accountability ratings
2011: Recognized
2010: Exemplary
2009: Recognized
2008: Recognized
2007: Academically Acceptable
2006: Academically Acceptable
2005: Academically Acceptable
2004: Recognized

District Realignment
Beginning with the 2008–2009 school year, Alvin Independent School District was realigned the following way: Sister schools (Alvin Primary School/Alvin Elementary School; Stevenson Primary School/Walt Disney Elementary School; and Mark Twain Primary School/Longfellow Elementary School) became grades PK-2 and 3–5. All other elementary schools were changed to grades PK-5 with 6th grade being transitioned to the Junior High level across the district. The two alternative schools were not affected by this realignment.

In November 2010 a School Boundary Advisory Committee began work on a new plan to realign the school zones to better balance the student populations and accommodate a new elementary school opening in August 2011 and a new junior high opening in 2012.

Campuses

High Schools (Grades 9th-12th)

Junior High Schools (Grades 6th-8th)

Elementary Schools (Grades PK-5th or Grades PK-2nd/3rd-5th)

Alternative Schools

See also

 List of school districts in Texas
 List of high schools in Texas

References

External links

 

School districts in Brazoria County, Texas
1925 establishments in Texas
Pearland, Texas